The fifth season of Australia's Next Top Model premiered  on 28 April 2009 on Fox8. Auditions were held during October and November 2008 across Australia, and production of the prerecorded episodes began in January 2009 and concluded in March 2009. Model and television personality Sarah Murdoch took over as the host for this season, replacing Jodhi Meares, and joining incumbent judges Alex Perry and Charlotte Dawson. Harper's Bazaar, Cosmopolitan and Maybelline replaced the previous season's regular sponsors, Vogue and Napoleon Perdis.

The prizes for this season included a one-year modelling contract with Priscilla's Model Management in Sydney, a  trip for two to New York City paid by Maybelline, a position as the face of Maybelline’s new colour collection, an eight-page spread in Harper's Bazaar Australia and  courtesy of U by Kotex.

The winner of the competition was 17-year-old Tahnee Atkinson from North Fremantle, Western Australia.

Cast

Contestants

(Ages stated are at start of contest.)

Judges
Sarah Murdoch (host)
Charlotte Dawson
Alex Perry

Other cast members
Jonathan Pease – style director, model mentor

Episodes

Results

 The contestant was immune from elimination
 The contestant was eliminated
 The contestant won the competition

Final votes

Average call-out order
Final two is not included.

Controversy
Before the season premiered, there was controversy over a number of issues.

Sixteen-year-old Cassi Van Den Dungen was criticised for being a "proud bogan and smoker" with her mother in support, having to take anger-management classes to control her temper whilst participating in the series, and for being engaged and living with a 25-year-old bricklayer. She also received backlash from Hume City Council mayor Jack Ogilvie over comments in which she described her hometown of Sunbury as "like a ghetto", with the mayor stating that Van Den Dungen was a "very immature, silly little girl" and that "she owes Sunbury an apology. I wonder if she knows what a ghetto is. Sunbury is far from being a ghetto, far from it."

Eighteen-year-old Mikarla Hussey's appearance initially shocked host Sarah Murdoch. In the second episode, a nutritionist assisted the contestants with healthy eating, weight management and lifestyle choices. Mikarla initially weighed 50 kg (110 lb) before production began. After her swimsuit photo shoot showed off her technically unhealthy body, she was forced to put on weight.

Lola Van Vorst was involved in a nude photo scandal, involving pictures taken by an ex-boyfriend.

On 6 June 2009, it was revealed that Clare Venema, Adele Thiel and Tahnee Atkinson had previous professional modelling experience that had not been disclosed during the show.

Notes

References

External links
Official website

2009 Australian television seasons
Australia's Next Top Model seasons
Television shows filmed in Australia
Television shows filmed in the United Arab Emirates
Television shows shot in London